The Leysse is the river which crosses the city of Chambéry, Savoie, France. At its entrance into the city, it goes underground in a channel of about one kilometer.

Characteristics

It comes from the mountains east of Chambéry, and continues to the north, until falling into the Lake of Le Bourget in the city of Le Bourget-du-Lac. The Lac du Bourget is drained by the Canal de Savières towards the Rhône.

See also

 List of rivers of France

References

Rivers of Savoie
Rivers of France
Rivers of Auvergne-Rhône-Alpes
Chambéry